The Emperor's New Clothes is a 1966 Florida short film directed by Bob Clark and based on the fairy tale of the same name and featured John Carradine.

See also
List of American films of 1966

External links

1966 films
Films based on works by Hans Christian Andersen
Films shot in Florida
Films directed by Bob Clark
1966 short films
Works based on The Emperor's New Clothes
Films based on fairy tales
1960s English-language films
American short films